Robert Smith (born 14 May 1946) is a New Zealand former cricketer. He played 33 first-class and 11 List A matches for Wellington between 1968 and 1977.

See also
 List of Wellington representative cricketers

References

External links
 

1946 births
Living people
New Zealand cricketers
Wellington cricketers
Cricketers from Wellington City